Nitshill railway station is situated in Nitshill, a district of Glasgow, Scotland.

History 
The station was opened by the Glasgow, Barrhead and Neilston Direct Railway on 27 September 1848.

Facilities
The station is unstaffed and has no ticketing provision, so all tickets must be bought prior to travel or on the train.  There are no permanent buildings here other than standard waiting shelters on each platform and a pedestrian footbridge. Train running information is offered via digital display screens, timetable posters and automated announcements; a help point is also provided on each side.  Step-free access is only possible to platform 1.

Services 
This drops to hourly in the evenings with southbound services extending to Kilmarnock with one extending to Dumfries.

From 21 May 2017 there is an hourly Sunday service to Glasgow Central and to Kilmarnock. Additionally, there is one afternoon service to Carlisle on Sundays.

References

Notes

Sources 
 
 
 
 RAILSCOT on Glasgow, Barrhead and Neilston Direct Railway
 RAILSCOT on Glasgow, Barrhead and Kilmarnock Joint Railway

External links
Video and commentary on Nitshill railway station and John Meikle VC

Railway stations in Glasgow
Former Glasgow, Barrhead and Kilmarnock Joint Railway stations
Railway stations in Great Britain opened in 1848
SPT railway stations
Railway stations served by ScotRail